The Pew Research Center is  a nonpartisan American think tank based in Washington, D.C. It provides information on social issues, public opinion, and demographic trends shaping the United States and the world. It also conducts public opinion polling, demographic research, random sample survey research and panel based surveys,  media content analysis, and other empirical social science research.

The Pew Research Center does not take policy positions, and is a subsidiary of The Pew Charitable Trusts.

History
In 1990, the Times Mirror Company founded the Times Mirror Center for the People & the Press as a research project, tasked with conducting polls on politics and policy. Andrew Kohut became its director in 1993, and The Pew Charitable Trusts became its primary sponsor in 1996, when it was renamed the Pew Research Center for the People & the Press.

In 2004, the trust established the Pew Research Center in Washington, D.C. In 2013, Kohut stepped down as president and became founding director, and Alan Murray became the second president of the center. In October 2014, Michael Dimock, a 14-year veteran of the Pew Research Center, was named president.

Funding
The Pew Research Center is a nonprofit, tax-exempt 501(c)(3) organization and a subsidiary of The Pew Charitable Trusts, its primary funder. For its studies focusing on demographics of religions in the world, the Pew Research Center has been jointly funded by the Templeton Foundation.

Research areas

The center's research includes the following areas:
 U.S. politics and policy
 Journalism and media
 Internet and technology
 Science and society
 Race and ethnicity
 Religion and public life
 Global attitudes and trends
 U.S. social and demographic trends

Reports 
Researchers at the Pew Research Center annually comb through publicly available sources of information and publications. The Pew Research Center released its 10th annual report on Global Restrictions on Religion as part of the Pew-Templeton Global Religious Futures project, funded by The Pew Charitable Trusts and the John Templeton Foundation. The annual report looked at events that took place about 18 months to two years before its publication. While the previous reports focused on year-over-year change, this report provides a broader look at the trend in particular regions and in 198 countries and territories. The report documents how government restrictions on religion and social hostilities involving religion have changed and increased, from 2007 to 2017. It said 52 governments impose high levels of restrictions on religion, up from 40 in 2007, while 56 countries experienced the highest levels of social hostilities involving religion, up from 38 in 2007. According to the report, laws and policies restricting religious freedom and government favoritism of religious groups are the two types of restrictions that have been the most prevalent. The trends suggest that religious restrictions have been rising around the world but not so evenly across all geographic regions or all kinds of restrictions.

The center published a new report with the General Social Survey on 13 September 2022 regarding the future trend of religion and reshaping of religion landscape in America. The report alleged that more and more Americans are leaving Christianity and identifying themselves as agnostic, atheist, or none. The Pew Research Center projects that Christians in America will decline from 64% to "between a little more than half (54%) and just above one-third (35%) by 2070". In total, the center and the General Social Survey suggested four possible scenarios: "a stable rate of people moving in and out of Christianity; an increasing share of Christians leaving their religion as a decreasing number of people with no religious affiliation switching in; the same as the former but with no more than 50% of Christians switching their identity; and a scenario in which no person changes their religion." Christianity may lose the majority ranking by 2070 if the trend continues.

References

External links
  – Pew Research Center
  of the Pew Charitable Trusts

2004 establishments in the United States
Intelligent Community Forum
Think tanks established in 2004
Public opinion research companies in the United States
Social statistics data
The Pew Charitable Trusts
Think tanks based in Washington, D.C.
Migration studies